Monsterpiece Theater is a recurring segment on the popular children's television series Sesame Street, a parody of Masterpiece Theatre.

Format
While using Muppet characters to act out educational principles, primarily Grover and other Muppet monsters, Monsterpiece Theater is also a parody of the similarly acclaimed PBS show Masterpiece Theatre, now known simply as Masterpiece. The theme song is also a modified version of Fanfare-Rondeau, the Masterpiece theme song, only with trumpets and a much more upbeat tempo.

Monsterpiece Theater is hosted by Alistair Cookie, a play on the journalist and television personality Alistair Cooke, portrayed by Cookie Monster. He wears a smoking jacket and holds a pipe which he usually ends up eating. The segments are loosely based on classic literature, plays, films, and TV shows. Similar segments, titled Mysterious Theater and parodying fellow PBS anthology Mystery!, are hosted by "Vincent Twice Vincent Twice," a parody of Vincent Price.

Alistair Cookie
Alistair Cookie is Cookie Monster's alter ego when hosting Monsterpiece Theater. Created as a spoof of the original Masterpiece Theatre host Alistair Cooke, Alistair Cookie is basically Cookie Monster in an English smoking jacket and ascot tie, although Cooke was neither a pipe smoker nor did he wear a smoking jacket on Masterpiece Theatre. Alistair Cookie introduced viewers to a spot of culture while relaxing in a well-stuffed armchair. Though seemingly more sedate and urbane, Alistair Cookie is still a Cookie Monster, devouring baked goods, props—and in the revamped opening in the 1990s, noisily consuming cookies over the theme, while offering judicious comments on the texture.

He used to appear smoking a pipe and then eating it at the end of each piece. In the late 1980s, the pipe was gone so as not to reinforce smoking as a positive attribute.

In a 2004 Chicago Public Radio interview, David Rudman (who performs Cookie Monster) referred to Cookie Monster's occasional use of more advanced phrases, such as "It a bit esoteric," as his Alistair Cookie side:

He throws out these words like, you know, "Me digress." It's his whole Alistair Cookie side... It's a whole 'nother side of Cookie, where he's just kinda, you know, laid back and intellectual, but he still has that "Me Alistair Cookie," and it's just such a funny contrast.

Alistair Cookie is generally a detached party who simply serves as a frame for the Monsterpiece Theater spoofs. Occasionally, however, the participants take their grievances directly to Alistair Cookie ("Twelve Angry Men", "One Flew Over the Cuckoo's Nest"), crash into his sanctum ("The 39 Stairs"), or otherwise disrupt his hosting duties. On rare occasions, Cookie Monster himself stars in the sketches, as in "Twin Beaks", invariably winning rave critical reviews from Alistair Cookie.

He was first introduced c. 1978. Alistair Cooke retired from Masterpiece Theater in 1992, replaced by American host Russell Baker, but this had no effect on Alistair Cookie, as reported in The Washington Post from February 24, 1993: "A spokeswoman for Sesame Street yesterday reassured its fans—and their children—that despite the change at the top, Cookie Monster will continue to appear as Alistair Cookie, the host of 'Monsterpiece Theater'—big chair, fireplace and all... 'We love that character,' said Ellen Morgenstern...".

Cooke himself was wryly appreciative of the take-off, predicting at a 1991 dinner celebrating the 20th anniversary of Masterpiece Theater that if he was remembered at all, he would be best recalled by fans of Sesame Street as "Alistair Cookie, the Cookie Monster of Monsterpiece Theater".

In 1998, Applause Toys offered a limited edition stuffed Alistair Cookie to collectors, complete with smoking jacket, slippers, and armchair. The item is still available through certain PBS stations.

Sketch listings

American Monster Classics
Episode Title: A Streetcar Named Monster
Time: 2:32
Release Date: September 24, 2007
Fun Fact: Cookie Monster introduces a spoof of A Streetcar Named Desire in which Grover has left his keys at the bowling alley. Because it's the crack of dawn, he must shout softly up to the window so that Stella may let him in.

CD games
The Sesame Street CD-ROM games Elmo Through the Looking-Glass and The Three Grouchketeers feature Monsterpiece Theater introductions.

See also
 Mouseterpiece Theater, a Disney Channel series hosted by George Plimpton

References

Sesame Street segments
Fictional television shows